Pavel Rakityansky (1928 – 1992) was a Russian modern pentathlete. He competed at the 1952 Summer Olympics.

References

1928 births
1992 deaths
Russian male modern pentathletes
Soviet male modern pentathletes
Olympic modern pentathletes of the Soviet Union
Modern pentathletes at the 1952 Summer Olympics
Sportspeople from Krasnodar